"Reggatta de Blanc" is a 1979 musical composition by The Police, and the title track on their second album. The instrumental evolved from improvisational stage jams during early Police performances of the song "Can't Stand Losing You". The track won the Grammy Award for Best Rock Instrumental Performance in 1980.

The song was developed from a live jam during the bridge of "Can't Stand Losing You."  Ultimate Classic Rock critic Mike Duquette rated it as the Police's 19th greatest song, saying that it "underlined the Police’s prowess as players."

Song appearances
  "Reggatta de Blanc" was used in The Ongoing History of New Music episode "Alt-Rock's Greatest Instrumentals" from 2003.

Personnel
Stewart Copeland: drums
Sting: bass, vocals
Andy Summers: guitar

References

The Police songs
1979 songs
Songs written by Sting (musician)
Rock instrumentals
Grammy Award for Best Rock Instrumental Performance
Song recordings produced by Nigel Gray
Songs written by Andy Summers
Songs written by Stewart Copeland